Hummer Team (Chinese: 悍馬小組) was a Taiwanese developer of bootleg Video games which was founded in 1992 and closed down in 2010.

History 
Hummer Team was founded in Taipei, Taiwan in 1992 and was dedicated to the development and publishing of unauthorized ports of video games for the Nintendo Famicom, primarily from the early 1990s to early 2000s. The first video game published by Hummer Team was Jing Ke Xin Zhuan (1992), a role-playing video game. Upon the releases of Kart Fighter (1993) and Somari (1994), company began to gain attention. In the late 1990s and early 2000s, Hummer Team began having economic troubles in the wake of the fifth generation of video game consoles, which Hummer Team had trouble developing for. By 2003, Nintendo had stopped producing Famicom cartridges, making it impossible for the Hummer Team to continue working on the platform. Despite Hummer's economic problems, the team continued to release video games for Plug and Play Consoles until 2006. Later in 2010, Hummer Team has closed down.

Recognition (1992 - 2006) 
Hummer Team's first game, Jing Ke Xin Zhuan, was released in 1992. The company was known in Argentina under the pseudonym Yoko Soft after having released Street Fighter: The World Warrior in 1993. Some of Hummer Team's better known games include Street Fighter II: The World Warrior, an unlicensed port of Street Fighter II, Kart Fighter, a Street Fighter clone infamously utilizing characters from the Super Mario Bros. series, and Somari, a port of the original Sonic the Hedgehog game to the Famicom, featuring Mario instead of Sonic. Somari in particular gained a bit of notoriety, having been made fun of by many content creators and video game journalists for its poor physics, modified object placement and replacement of Sonic as the main character.

Games

References 

Video game development companies
Video gaming in Taiwan
Unauthorized video games